David Bruce Wharton (born 1954, Basel, Switzerland) is a Career Foreign Service Officer who served as Ambassador Extraordinary and Plenipotentiary to Zimbabwe from 2012 until 2015.  Before then, he was Deputy Assistant Secretary for Public Diplomacy in the State Department's Bureau of African Affairs.  He retired in 2017.

Wharton is a graduate of the University of Texas in Austin.

References

1954 births
Living people
Ambassadors of the United States to Zimbabwe
University of Texas at Austin alumni
21st-century American diplomats